Haldur is a village in Badami taluka, Bagalkot district, Karnataka state, India.

See also
 Pattadakal
 Mahakuta
 Aihole
 Gajendragad
 Sudi
 North Karnataka

References

Villages in Bagalkot district